HMCS Baddeck is a name used by the Royal Canadian Navy for several vessels. The name derives from Baddeck, Nova Scotia.

 , a Flower-class corvette
 , an experimental hydrofoil

Battle honours

 Atlantic, 1941–45
 Normandy, 1944
 English Channel, 1944–45

References

 Government of Canada Ships' Histories - HMCS Baddeck

Royal Canadian Navy ship names